Pengiki Besar Island (Indonesian: Pulau Pengiki Besar), also known as St. Barbe Island is an island in the South China Sea. The island is part of Indonesia.

Description 
The island has two bays, and its waters are heavily populated with coral. The island is heavily forested.

References 
 

Islands of the South China Sea
Islands of Indonesia